Robert Åke Nilsson (born January 10, 1985) is a Canadian-born Swedish former professional ice hockey forward. He last played with the ZSC Lions of the National League (NL).

Playing career
Nilsson began his career in the Elitserien with Leksands IF in 2002–03.  He recorded 21 points in his rookie season, breaking Markus Näslund's 13-year mark for most points by a 17-year-old in the league.  Nilsson was then drafted by the New York Islanders with the 15th overall pick in the 2003 NHL Entry Draft.

He remained in Sweden an additional two seasons, which included a brief, seven-game stint with HC Fribourg-Gottéron of the Swiss Nationalliga A, before joining the Islanders in 2005–06.  Nilsson scored his first NHL goal within a month of his debut on October 29, 2005, against the Buffalo Sabres.  Nilsson, however, struggled to adjust to the NHL style of play and was sent down to the Bridgeport Sound Tigers, the Islanders' American Hockey League (AHL) affiliate.  After scoring 28 points (8 goals, 20 assists) in 29 games for the Sound Tigers, Nilsson was recalled to finish the year with the Islanders, recording 20 points in 53 total games during his NHL rookie season. At one point, Nilsson played on the top line with team captain Alexei Yashin and close friend Sean Bergenheim.

In 2006–07, Nilsson was sent back to the Sound Tigers to start the season. He remained with the club until February 27, 2007, when he was dealt to the Edmonton Oilers with Ryan O'Marra and the Islanders' first-round pick in the 2007 NHL Entry Draft for Ryan Smyth. Nilsson transferred AHL teams accordingly and began playing in the Oilers' farm system with the Wilkes-Barre/Scranton Penguins.  During a call-up, he scored his first goal as an Oiler on March 15, 2007. He would go on to record a combined 70 points during his next two seasons with the Oilers.

On June 30, 2010, the remainder of Nilsson's contract was bought out by the Oilers. He had one year remaining on his original three-year contract, and would have earned $2.5 million with a $2 million hit against the salary cap. With this buyout, Nilsson became an unrestricted free agent.

On July 22, 2010, it became known that Nilsson had signed a 2-year contract with Salavat Yulaev Ufa of the Kontinental Hockey League.

He transferred to fellow KHL side Torpedo Nizhny Novgorod during the 2011-12 season, where he also spent the following 2012-13 campaign.

Nilsson signed a three-year deal with the ZSC Lions of the Swiss top-flight National League A (NLA) in 2013. Throughout ZSC’s 2013-14 championship run, he scored 10 goals and assisted on 24 more in 31 games. He converted the championship-winning penalty in game 4 of the finals against Kloten.

During the 2015–16 season, Nilsson would spend time on a line with coveted draft prospect Auston Matthews, finding chemistry with the young centre, winning the Swiss Cup competition with the Lions that season.

International play
Nilsson represented Sweden at the 2008 and 2011 IIHF World Championships, winning silver in 2011, as well as at the 2003, 2004 and 2005 World Junior Championships.

Nilsson played with the Legendary: Game of Heroes world renowned champion guild The War Beasts [WarB] from the Jade Forest Event of November 2017 through the Grimoure of Darkness Event of April 2018.

Personal life
Nilsson was born in Canada while his father, Kent Nilsson, was a member of the NHL's Calgary Flames. The majority of his childhood, however, was spent in Sweden. He is cousins with former professional ice hockey player Niklas Persson.

In 2016, Nilsson married Sasha Khabibulin, the daughter of former teammate, Nikolai Khabibulin.

Career statistics

Regular season and playoffs

International

References

External links

1985 births
Living people
Almtuna IS players
Bridgeport Sound Tigers players
Djurgårdens IF Hockey players
Edmonton Oilers players
Expatriate ice hockey players in Russia
Canadian expatriate ice hockey players in Russia
Hammarby Hockey (1921–2008) players
HC Fribourg-Gottéron players
Leksands IF players
National Hockey League first-round draft picks
New York Islanders draft picks
New York Islanders players
Salavat Yulaev Ufa players
Springfield Falcons players
Ice hockey people from Calgary
Swedish expatriate sportspeople in Switzerland
Swedish expatriate sportspeople in Russia
Swedish expatriate ice hockey players in the United States
Swedish ice hockey centres
Toros Neftekamsk players
Torpedo Nizhny Novgorod players
Wilkes-Barre/Scranton Penguins players
ZSC Lions players
Canadian expatriate ice hockey players in Switzerland
Canadian expatriate ice hockey players in the United States